"Sunday Will Never Be the Same" is a 1967 song by the American band Spanky and Our Gang from their self-titled debut album. The single peaked at #9 on the Billboard Hot 100  and #7 in the Canadian RPM Magazine charts. The song was written by Terry Cashman and Gene Pistilli and borrows an interlude from the French carol “Les Anges Dans Nos Campagnes”. The arrangement is by Jimmy Wisner.

As with most of the band’s hit singles, producer Jerry Ross used a group of session musicians to provide the instrumental backing track while the rest of the group members provided lead and background vocals. Session personnel on this record included Vinnie Bell, Al Gorgoni, Hugh McCracken, Charles Macey on guitar, Paul Griffin on piano, Artie Butler on harpsichord, Joe Macho on bass, Bobby Gregg and Al Rogers on drums, Joe Macho, Irving Spice, Louis Stone, Ray Free, Matthew Raimondi, Lou Haber on violins, Artie Kaplan on flute, and Seymour Barab and Maurice Bialkin on cellos. Additional instruments were also played by Samuel Casale, Charles Naclerio, Joe Renzetti, and Jimmy Wisner.

Cover versions
The O'Kaysions released a version of the song on their 1968 debut album, Girl Watcher.
A series of 1969 television commercials for Plymouth featured a jingle "Just look what Plymouth's up to now", sung by  Petula Clark to the tune of "Sunday Will Never Be the Same".

References

External links
037302 - Sunday Will Never Be The Same - Spanky & Our Gang, Sound Recording Division Album/Single Titles & Performing Artists

1967 songs
1967 singles
Songs written by Terry Cashman
Spanky and Our Gang songs
The O'Kaysions songs
Mercury Records singles
American pop songs